Deolali Pravara  is a town in Rahuri Taluka, Ahmednagar District, India.

Demographics
 India census, Deolali Pravara had a population of 30,334. Males constitute 52% of the population and females 48%. Deolali Pravara has an average literacy rate of 65%, higher than the national average of 59.5%: male literacy is 73% and, female literacy is 57%. In Deolali Pravara, 12% of the population is under 6 years of age.

References

Cities and towns in Ahmednagar district